Mediashopping was an Italian shopping TV channel launched on September 30, 2005, that transmitted 24-hour in Italy on DTT channel 121 on Mux Mediaset 2 and on digital satellite platform SKY Italia channel 808, whose origins go back to 1998 with the channel H.O.T. Italia became first Home Shopping Europe in 2001 and then Canale D in 2003.

Since March 1, 2011, the channel is replaced by ME become For you on June 6, 2011.

Mediashopping as a company

Mediashopping S.p.A. is a company of Mediaset group, owner of the TV channel for you, until March 1, 2011, called with the homonymous name.

Brand

TV promotions with its own brand, still existing, are transmitted by the channel Mediaset, for shopping with phone and web.

See also
Digital television in Italy
Home shopping
Mediaset

References

External links
 Official Site 

Defunct television channels in Italy
Mediaset television channels
Television channels and stations established in 2005
Television channels and stations disestablished in 2011
2005 establishments in Italy
2011 disestablishments in Italy
Italian-language television stations
Italian brands